Yanase (written: ,  or  in hiragana) is a Japanese surname. Notable people with the surname include:

, Japanese baseball player
, Japanese water polo player
, Japanese swimmer
, Japanese voice actress
, Japanese politician
, Japanese writer, poet, illustrator and lyricist

Fictional characters
, a character in the video game Variable Geo

Japanese-language surnames